Velamysta pupilla is a species of butterfly of the family Nymphalidae. It is found in Bolivia, Colombia and Ecuador.

Subspecies
Velamysta pupilla pupilla (Bolivia)
Velamysta pupilla anomala (Staudinger, [1884]) (Colombia)
Velamysta pupilla cruxifera (Hewitson, 1877) (Ecuador)
Velamysta pupilla greeneyi Vitale & Bollino, 2003 (Ecuador)
Velamysta pupilla veronica (Weymer, 1899) (Colombia)

References

Butterflies described in 1874
Ithomiini
Nymphalidae of South America
Taxa named by William Chapman Hewitson